Kalna Polytechnic, established in 2002, is a government polytechnic college located in Kalna, Purba Bardhaman district, West Bengal.

About college
This polytechnic is affiliated to the West Bengal State Council of Technical Education (WBSCTE), and is recognised by the All India Council ForTechnical Education (AICTE), New Delhi. This polytechnic offers diploma courses in Computer Science & Technology (DCST), Electronics & Telecommunication (DETC) and Civil Engineering (DCE). It also has on site hostels for girls only. There are various facilities provided to the students like a playing field, lab equipment's, well maintained computer lab's, etc.

See also

References

External links
Official website WBSCTE
 Admission to Polytechnics in West Bengal for Academic Session 2006-2007

Universities and colleges in Purba Bardhaman district
Educational institutions established in 2002
2002 establishments in West Bengal
Technical universities and colleges in West Bengal